A revolving restaurant or rotating restaurant is usually a tower restaurant eating space designed to rest atop a broad circular revolving platform that operates as a large turntable. The building remains stationary and the diners are carried on the revolving floor. The revolving rate varies between one and three times per hour and enables patrons to enjoy a panoramic view without leaving their seats.

Such restaurants are often located on upper stories of hotels, communication towers, and skyscrapers.

Design and construction 
Revolving restaurants are designed as a circular structure, with a platform that rotates around a core in the center. The center core contains the building's elevators, kitchens, or other features.

The restaurant itself rests on a thin steel platform, with the platform sitting on top of a series of wheels connected to the floor of the structure. Alternatively, some designs, like one in Memphis, Tennessee, have the platform mounted on tires.

A motor rotates the restaurant at less than one horsepower. The speed of rotation is noted to vary, depending on preference.

History
It is believed that Emperor Nero had a rotating dining room in his palace Domus Aurea on the Palatine Hill with a magnificent view on the Forum Romanum and Colosseum. Archaeologists unearthed what they believed to be evidence of such a dining room in 2009.

A similar device, the rotary jail, was invented in the 1800s. The idea was to prevent contact between prisoners and guards. Few prisons of this kind were built due to the technical difficulties of maintaining a rotating prison, in addition to evacuation safety concerns and prisoners getting their limbs caught in or torn off by pinch points in the design.

Architect and designer Norman Bel Geddes proposed a rotating restaurant for the Century of Progress, the 1933 World's Fair in Chicago, although it was not built. 

A barrel-shaped, but stationary, restaurant on Fernsehturm Stuttgart, a TV tower in Stuttgart, Germany, built in 1956, was noted as the inspiration for the idea of a revolving restaurant. A revolving restaurant on Florianturm, a TV tower in Dortmund, Germany, was brought into service in 1959.

The Egyptian architect Naoum Shebib designed the Cairo Tower with a revolving restaurant at its top, which opened in April 1961.

The first revolving restaurant in the Balkans was built on the top floor of the OTE tower as part of the 34th Thessaloniki International Fair in 1965. The revolving restaurant was then closed, but has been in continued service since 1969. 

John Graham, a Seattle architect and early shopping mall pioneer, is said to be the first in the United States to design a revolving restaurant, at La Ronde, atop an office building at the Ala Moana Center in Honolulu in 1961. Graham was awarded US patent 3125189 for the invention in 1964, and used the technology to build the former revolving "Eye of the Needle" restaurant at the top of Seattle's Space Needle, drawings of which appear in the patent application.

The tallest revolving restaurant in the world is The TWIST Mediterranean Buffet, a revolving door restaurant located in Guangzhou, China. TWIST is the third highest restaurant in the world and the highest revolving restaurant in the world at 1,387 feet on the 106th floor of the Canton building. Canton Tower is the world's second tallest tower and the fifth-tallest freestanding structure. The second tallest revolving restaurant in the world and seventh tallest restaurant in the world is 360, the restaurant at the CN Tower in Toronto, Canada, was number one in 1975–2010. Number three now is Seventh Heaven in Moscow, which was number one in 1967–75.

The Telkom tower in South Africa Johannesburg, housed two rotating restaurants, namely the Grill Room and Heinrichs restaurant. It was built in 1971 but closed in 1981 due to security reasons.

Tex Palazzo Hotel in Surat was the first Revolving Restaurant in India started in 1973.

Some revolving restaurants no longer revolve due to the extremely high costs of repairs.

Safety
One death has been attributed to the operation of a rotating restaurant. In 2017, a five-year-old boy was wedged between the rotating part of the restaurant and a wall at the Westin Peachtree Plaza Hotel in Atlanta, Georgia, United States.

See also
 Floating restaurant
 Googie architecture
 List of revolving restaurants

References

External links

 
 

Restaurants by type